The Mutin was a school cutter of the French Navy.

Career 
Mutin was launched in 1883 to serve as a school ship. She served as an auxiliary warship during the First World War.

She was offered to the École navale in 1924, and served as a schoolship as Sylphe.

She was decommissioned in 1937, though she still sailed in Toulon in 1942-1943.

Citations

References
Demerliac, Alain (1996) La Marine De Louis XVI: Nomenclature Des Navires Français De 1774 À 1792. (Nice: Éditions OMEGA). 
 

1883 ships
Captured ships